Pterolophia punctigera is a species of beetle in the family Cerambycidae. It was described by Francis Polkinghorne Pascoe in 1865. It is known from Borneo, Sumatra and Malaysia.

References

punctigera
Beetles described in 1865